Glucuronylgalactosylproteoglycan 4-beta-N-acetylgalactosaminyltransferase (N-acetylgalactosaminyltransferase I, glucuronylgalactosylproteoglycan beta-1,4-N-acetylgalactosaminyltransferase, uridine diphosphoacetylgalactosamine-chondroitin acetylgalactosaminyltransferase I, UDP-N-acetyl-D-galactosamine:D-glucuronyl-1,3-beta-D-galactosyl-proteoglycan beta-1,4-N-acetylgalactosaminyltransferase) is an enzyme with systematic name UDP-N-acetyl-D-galactosamine:D-glucuronyl-(1->3)-beta-D-galactosyl-proteoglycan 4-beta-N-acetylgalactosaminyltransferase. This enzyme catalyses the following chemical reaction

 UDP-N-acetyl-D-galactosamine + beta-D-glucuronyl-(1->3)-D-galactosyl-proteoglycan  UDP + N-acetyl-D-galactosaminyl-(1->4)-beta-D-glucuronyl-(1->3)-beta-D-galactosylproteoglycan

This enzyme requires Mn2+.

References

External links 
 

EC 2.4.1